Himamylan (historically Himamylan Islet) is an uninhabited island in northeastern Iloilo, Philippines. It is one of fourteen islands politically administered by the municipality of Carles.

Location and geography 

Himamylan is a small island northeast of the Panay Island coast in the Visayan Sea. Himamylan sits in the Nilidlaran Pass, which is the body of water between Binuluangan and nearby Calagnaan Island.

See also 

 List of islands in the Philippines
 List of islands
 Desert island

References

External links
 Himamylan Island at OpenStreetMap

Islands of Iloilo
Uninhabited islands of the Philippines